is a Japan-exclusive role-playing game published by Bandai for the PlayStation. It is the fourth game to be based on the One Piece manga and anime. This game's introduction uses the theme song Believe from the One Piece Anime.

Plot
In story mode, Luffy and his gang of pirates go on a journey to find the treasure called "Inishie no Kakera".

Gameplay

Starting a New Game
When a new game begins, Luffy will introduce himself and tell the player about the world of One Piece. The player will then create a three different characters (a hero and a male and female partner).

Hero Stat Types
Luffy Type:      Buggy Type:      Kuro Type:      Krieg Type:      Arlong Type:
Attack - 50      Attack - 40      Attack - 30      Attack - 50      Attack - 50 Defense - 40   Defense - 40    Defense - 30   Defense - 50   Defense - 40 Speed - 30      Speed - 30      Speed - 50      Speed - 10      Speed - 20

Male Partner Stat Types
Zoro Type:      Sanji Type:      Usopp Type:      Gin Type:      Chopper Type:
Attack - 50      Attack - 40      Attack - 20      Attack - 40      Attack - 30 Defense - 20   Defense - 30    Defense - 30   Defense - 20   Defense - 50 Speed - 30      Speed - 30      Speed - 50      Speed - 40      Speed - 20

Female Partner Stat Types
Nami Type:      Alvida Type:      Tashigi Type:      Vivi Type:      Kureha Type:
Attack - 50      Attack - 40      Attack - 20      Attack - 40      Attack - 40 Defense - 20   Defense - 30    Defense - 30   Defense - 20   Defense - 10 Speed - 30      Speed - 30      Speed - 50      Speed - 40      Speed - 50

References

External links
From TV Animation - One Piece: Set Sail Pirate Crew! at Bandai (in Japanese)
From TV Animation - One Piece: Set Sail Pirate Crew! at GameFAQs

2001 video games
PlayStation (console) games
PlayStation (console)-only games
Japan-exclusive video games
Bandai games
One Piece games
Toei Animation video game projects
Video games developed in Japan